= Swiftarc Ventures =

American venture capital firm, 2019–2023

- Type: Private
- Industry: Venture capital
- Founded: 2019
- Founders: Sid Jawahar
- Headquarters: New York City, U.S.
- Website: swiftarcventures.com

Swiftarc Ventures was an American-based early and growth stage venture capital fund headquartered in New York City.

Swiftarc also has offices in Miami, FL.

== History ==
The Swiftarc Ventures was founded in 2019 by Sid Jawahar.

== Investments ==
Swiftarc claimed to invest in telehealth and early-stage consumer tech and food sustainability companies.

Its major invests included Intellihealth, R-Zero, and Artiphon.

The firm had two separate invest funds - Swiftarc Venture Labs Fund, Swiftarc Telehealth Fund.

The firm was operational from 2016 to 2023. Jawahar took over $35 million from 64 investors. He pleaded guilty to 3 counts of wire fraud in January 2026

== Controversy & Fraud ==
In 2022, Swiftarc Ventures founder Sid Jawahar was ordered to cease and desist from engaging in fraud after it was found that, since September 2019, Swiftarc Capital and Jawahar had been engaging in fraud by overvaluing an illiquid, sizable position owned by the Swiftarc Fund, LP (the “Fund”), which was managed by Swiftarc Capital and Jawahar. As a result of his fraudulent activity, Mr. Jawahar's fund, Swiftarc Capital, LLC, had its investment adviser registration revoked by the Texas Securities Commissioner.

In direct violation of the Texas State Securities Board's order to cease and desist from engaging in fraud, Mr. Jawahar solicited a $1 million investment from an investor only weeks after the order was given. In December 2023, Sid Jawahar was indicted by a grand jury in the U.S. District Court in St. Louis on three counts of wire fraud and one count of investment adviser fraud. In January 2024, Mr. Jawahar was arrested in Miami. He could face up to 20 years in prison for each count of wire fraud and up to five years for investment fraud

Jawahar was sentenced to 11 years in prison as a result and ordered to pay $31M in restitution to the victims.
